Suthorn Parmkerd (born 2 May 1934) is a Thai sports shooter. He competed in the men's 50 metre rifle, prone event at the 1976 Summer Olympics.

References

1934 births
Living people
Suthorn Parmkerd
Suthorn Parmkerd
Shooters at the 1976 Summer Olympics
Place of birth missing (living people)